14 is a 2012 science fiction novel by American author Peter Clines.

Plot
14 follows Nate Tucker, who lives in Los Angeles, is stuck doing data entry and doesn't know what he's doing with his life. Just as he needs to move out of his old place, Nate hears of an apartment building with extremely low rent at an after work get-together, and once Nate signs his lease for 565 dollars a month (including utilities) at the Kavach building, the mysteries of the old Los Angeles brownstone begin to unravel.

Nate discovers that his building manager Oskar Rommel is reluctant to tell him much about the building. He also discovers that there is a colony of bright green, seven-legged cockroaches that skitter around his apartment, his kitchen light is a black light no matter what kind of bulb he puts in, and the four massive padlocks that are on apartment 14. In addition to discovering the visible oddities of his building, Nate also encounters his neighbors Veek, Roger, Xela, Clive, Debbie and the newly moved-in Tim. Together, they slowly unveil the deeper hidden secrets of the Kavach building. Over the course of the novel, the group, with Nate at the lead, discover that the building is not hooked into the Los Angeles power grid and instead pulls its power from a series of Westinghouse generators that draw from a fault line almost a mile underneath Kavach. They also discover writing on all of the walls of various apartments that includes scientific formulas, population growth algorithms and a letter from one of the men who created Kavach, Aleksander Koturovich, which helps answer the mysterious questions about the nature of the building. Aleksander Koturovic along with Whipple Van Buren Phillips and Nikola Tesla helped finance and construct the Kavach building as a protective barrier around our reality, meant to guard against a species of multi-dimensional predators that appear in our world once the total population of the planet reached a critical point, consuming everything in their path before returning to their home dimension to await the next turn of the cycle. 

Nate and the others also discover that beneath the paneling of Clive and Debbie's apartment is a series of knobs and switches that are meant to act as the controls for the building. As Nate and the others break into apartment 14 to discover the last of the mysteries of their building, they realize that a pocket of space is within the apartment which acts as a counterbalance for the power of the building. The apex of the story occurs when Andrew, another resident of Kavach who is also a member of the Family of the Red Death (a doomsday cult that worships Koturovic's alpha predators), deactivates the building, causing the barrier to fail and the creatures to emerge. Nate and the other residents of the Kavach building hurriedly work to change the switches and dials on the control panel in Clive and Debbie's apartment. Oskar gets captured by a flying creature, they fail to get him back and in the process of trying, Tim dies. Nate and the other residents of Kavach, save for Andrew, Oskar and Tim, fixes the control room and returns the creatures back to their dimension and the building itself back to Los Angeles. The novel ends with Nate succeeding Oskar as the new building manager of Kavach

Characters 
 Nate Tucker - the main character of 14, a man in his 30's that struggled to find purpose in his life until he uncovered the mysteries of his apartment building. 
 Malavika "Veek" Vishwanath - an Indian woman who ends up as Nate's significant other, she is also a black hat hacker and is one of the main characters in Terminus.
 Anne - Played minor characters in both 14 (as a temp at Nate's work) and in The Fold (as a receptionist) but is the major antagonist in Terminus.

Reception

For the novel 14, Nerds on Earth reviewer Joseph Robinson praised the work for the mysterious build-up that occurred during the novel as it was something that defied his own expectations for the piece. Robinson also comments that the characters in the novel are not completely fleshed out and only really make decisions that further the plot of the book.

Origins

In the afterword to 14, Peter Clines reveals that the debut of 14 started as an advanced readers edition copy that Clines sold at the 2012 Crypticon in Seattle prior to the actual publication of the book.

References

2012 science fiction novels
2012 American novels
American science fiction novels
Novels set in Los Angeles